"No Souvenirs" is a song by American singer-songwriter Melissa Etheridge, release as the second single from her second album, Brave and Crazy, in August 1989. Despite peaking at number 95 on the US Billboard Hot 100, the song experienced more success internationally, reaching number 30 in Australia and number four in Canada, where it became her highest-charting single until "I Want to Come Over" reached number one in 1996.

Song information
"No Souvenirs" was actually written before the first album came out but Melissa Etheridge decided to keep it back until the second album since its original intro was too similar to the intro of "Bring Me Some Water". The song is about a love affair that goes by very fast and leaves "no souvenirs". The lyrics reflect a phone call the singer makes a while after the breakup reminding her lover that she can still get in touch with her but that she would also accept it if she destroys all the souvenirs of that relationship. On the bonus DVD of her greatest hits album, Etheridge states that this is the song she gets the most questions about since it names various words she has created and phrases that mean specific things to her ("Jackpot telephone", "Make the buffalo roam"...).

Music video

The music video was shot in 1989 and shows the singer sitting at the dock of a bay playing the guitar with her band in the background. The video plays at night in a big city, most likely New York regarding the skyline in the background. The scene is interrupted by various short films showing her lover destroying the souvenirs of the very short love affair. To illustrate the anonymous character of that relationship, the head of the person is not visible.

Track listings
All songs were written by Melissa Etheridge.

7-inch, cassette, and mini-CD single
 "No Souvenirs" – 4:33
 "No Souvenirs" (live) – 4:43

US maxi-CD single
 "No Souvenirs" – 4:33
 "No Souvenirs" (live) – 4:43
 "Like the Way I Do" (live) – 10:46

UK 12-inch and CD single
A1. "No Souvenirs" – 4:33
B1. "Brave and Crazy" (live) – 4:47
B2. "No Souvenirs" (live) – 4:43

Credits and personnel
 vocals and 12 string guitar by Melissa Etheridge
 Bass, recording and mix by Kevin McCormick
 drums and cymbals by Mauricio Fritz Lewak
 Electric guitar by Bernie Larsen
 keyboards by Scott Thurston
 Acoustic guitar by Waddy Wachtel
 Harmonica by Bono
 Arrangement by Kevin McCormick and Melissa Etheridge
 Engineering by Bob Vogt

Charts

Weekly charts

Year-end charts

References

 Melissa Etheridge and Laura Morton: The Truth Is..., Random House 2002
 Greatest Hits: The Road Less Traveled bonus DVD
 Bring me some water at musicmoz.org
 Melissa Etheridge records

1989 singles
1989 songs
Island Records singles
Melissa Etheridge songs
Song recordings produced by Niko Bolas
Songs written by Melissa Etheridge